Pink and Say is a children's book written and illustrated by Patricia Polacco. It was first published in 1994 by Philomel Books. The story is about two boy soldiers who meet each other in the battlefield during the American Civil War. One of the protagonists, Sheldon Russell Curtis ("Say"), is a white soldier who was injured while trying to escape battle. He is saved by a former slave named Pinkus Aylee ("Pink"), who is now a soldier of the 48th Regiment Infantry U.S. Colored Troops. Pink carries him back to his Georgia home where he and his family were slaves. While the frightened soldier is nursed back to health under the care of Pink’s mother, Moe Moe Bay, he begins to understand why his newfound friend is so adamant on returning to the war; to fight against the sickness that is slavery.

Plot 
The story begins during the times of the Civil War. Sheldon Russell Curtis or "Say", a white Union Soldier is badly wounded on the battlefield. He tries to escape with an injured leg, but cannot due to the pain. Lying on the ground, he sees an African American Yankee soldier named Pinkus Aylee or "Pink" coming to his rescue. Sheldon is very hesitant at first, as Pink was an African American; one of the people that he was warned about. Pink gives Say some water for what little nourishment he can offer. Carefully, Pink carries Say back to his home in Georgia, where he lives with his mother, Moe Moe Bay. There, Pink and his mother restore Say back to full health. This act of great kindness brings Say to be friends with Pink and his mother as they spend long days with each other, enjoying the peace they have. Later, a group of "Marauders" Confederate soldiers came to search Pink’s home. Only barely foreseeing the coming raid, Moe Moe Bay tells Pink and Say to hide in the root cellar, out of the sight of the soldiers. The soldiers shot and killed Moe Moe Bay in an attempt to distract them from the boys. Pink and Say eventually came out of the cellar and found Moe Moe Bay's dead body lying on the ground. They decide to bury her, then Pink and Say decide to try to find their troops. On the way back to their camp some Confederates found them and took them to their camp as prisoners. The two prisoners of war receive vastly different treatment: Say is held captive in a prison camp for months before he is released, while Pink was hanged within hours, his body thrown in a lime pit. 
At the end of the story, Polacco lets the reader know that Sheldon Curtis was her great-great-grandfather, and that the story of Pink and Say was an oral tradition in her family; she wrote the book to serve "as a written memory of Pinkus Aylee", Polacco's great-great-grandfather's hero.

Reception
Pink and Say was well received by literary critics. Anita Silvey said in 2012 that she still cries every time she reads it. "In forty-eight pages Patricia Polacco brings children into the loss and heartache of the Civil War." It has also been called "probably the most powerful picture book written about the Civil War".

Pink and Say has been used by educators to engage with students in dialogue about topics such as race relations and man's inhumanity to man, and to teach them about the Civil War.

Publication history
1994: Paperback, Philomel Books.
1996: Audio CD, Spoken Arts.
1997: In Spanish translation, Lectorum.
February 15, 2000: In Chinese translation, Yuan-Liou Publishing.

References

1994 children's books
American picture books
American Civil War books
Philomel Books books